The spotted-necked ctenotus (Ctenotus greeri)  is a species of skink found in Northern Territory and Western Australia.

References

greeri
Reptiles described in 1979
Taxa named by Glen Milton Storr